Suat Berk (1901 – 15 July 2002) was the first female judge in Turkey.

She was born on 2 April 1901 in Istanbul. Her birth name was Suat Hilmi. She graduated from the Law school of Istanbul University (then named Darülfunun ) . In 1925, she was appointed as a justice of the peace(magistrate) . In 1933, she went to Berlin, Nazi Germany for doctorate studies. In 1951, she was elected as the member of Ankara Bar Association. She was the first female judge in Turkey. According to her son in 1925 when she was appointed as a judge, women judges were allowed to serve only in juvenile courts in many countries.

After she retired  from the public service, she continued as a lawyer of İşbank, Halkbank and Tekel.

Private life
While in Berlin, she met Niyazi Ozman, a Turkish Navy officer n the rank of a captain, and married briefly to him. She had one son named Ahmet from this marriage.

She died in Bodrum, Muğla Province on 15 July 2002, and was buried in Bitez.

References

1901 births
Lawyers from Istanbul
Istanbul University Faculty of Law alumni
Turkish women civil servants
Turkish civil servants
Turkish judges
20th-century Turkish lawyers
Turkish centenarians
2002 deaths
Women centenarians